The 2001–02 Algerian Cup was the 37th edition of the Algerian Cup. WA Tlemcen won the Cup by defeating MC Oran 1-0. It was WA Tlemcen second  Algerian Cup in its history.

Round of 64

Round of 32

Round of 16

Quarter-finals

Semi-finals

Final

Champions

External links
 2001/02 Coupe Nationale

Algerian Cup
Algerian Cup
Algerian Cup